Verșești may refer to several places in Romania:

Verșești, a village in Sănduleni Commune, Bacău County
Verșești, a village in Girov Commune, Neamț County